Weisong Shi is a Professor and Department Chair of Computer and Information Sciences at University of Delaware in Newark, Delaware. He is an internationally renowned expert in Edge Computing and Autonomous Vehicles. He was named a Fellow of the Institute of Electrical and Electronics Engineers (IEEE) in 2016 for his contributions to distributed systems and Internet computing. In 2022, he received the Most Influential Scholar Award in the field of the Internet of Things by AI 2000. The 2022 winners are among the most-impactful scholars from the top venues of their respective subject fields between 2012 and 2021.

References

External links
 Official website

Fellow Members of the IEEE
Living people
Year of birth missing (living people)
American electrical engineers